Reign is a New York-based fashion retailer and online store selling clothing, footwear, and accessories for men and women, established in 2017 and based in the Meatpacking District of Manhattan, in New York City. The store sells a mix of fashion products consisting of ready to wear, footwear, and accessories from numerous labels including Supreme, Off-White, Alexander Wang, Juun.J, Balmain, Rick Owens, A.P.C., Public School, and Tim Coppens.

History 

Reign is a fashion retail store that opened its doors in November 2017. Founded by Santino LoConte, the former head of global product collaborations at Pony. Reign aims to be much more than a simple shop by creating an experience to its customers. With 1600 square feet of shopping space and a private courtyard, Reign offers high-value products with contemporary design. To further expand the reach of its vision, Reign has formed a strategic partnership with Samsung C&T Fashion Group. 

Subsequently, in 2018 within its first year of establishment Reign collaborated with renowned global retailer 10 Corso Como on a shop-in-shop location at the 10 Corso Como New York store. With this combination of world-class brand partnerships, stylistic vision and innovative design, Reign is quickly becoming one of the most talked-about destinations for stylish shopping in NYC.

LoConte wanted to create a space that welcomed streetwear-inspired style, which has become increasingly popular over the past decade; collections from labels such as Supreme, Off-White, Alexander Wang, and Public School have drawn in many fans interested in this particular fashion. Even prominent luxury brands like Louis Vuitton, Longchamp and Prada have featured capsule collections that prove their own edgy style. As a result of LoConte's insight into the trends of fashion, Reign stands out amongst them, creating a distinct and pleasant shopping experience for its customers.

See also 
 10 Corso Como
 Samsung C&T Fashion Group

References 

Clothing retailers of the United States
Companies based in New York City